Hooper Bald is a grassy bald mountain in the Unicoi Mountain Range located in the Cheoah Ranger District (northwestern district) of Nantahala National Forest in Graham County, North Carolina, United States.  The summit is 5,429 ft/1,655 m.

Hiking

The summit of Hooper Bald can be reached via the 0.5 mile Hooper Bald Trail.  The parking area and trailhead is located between mile marker 7 and 8 along the North Carolina side of the Cherohala Skyway.

See also
List of major Appalachian Balds
Joyce Kilmer-Slickrock Wilderness
Joyce Kilmer Memorial Forest
Robbinsville, North Carolina
Tellico Plains, Tennessee
Bob Stratton Bald

References

 Hooper Bald Trail

Landmarks in North Carolina
Nantahala National Forest
Mountains of North Carolina
Unicoi Mountains
Landforms of Graham County, North Carolina